The 2019 Las Vegas mayoral election took place on April 2, 2019, to elect the Mayor of Las Vegas, Nevada. The election was held concurrently with various other local elections, and is officially nonpartisan. Goodman's main opponent was Republican Phil Collins.

Incumbent Mayor Carolyn Goodman, an Independent in office since 2011, was reelected to a third term in office. With Goodman winning a majority in the initial round of the election, no runoff was needed.

Due to a state law adopted in 2019, this was the regularly-scheduled last Las Vegas mayoral election to be conducted in an off-year.

Results

References

2019
2019 Nevada elections
2019 United States mayoral elections